The national flag of Brazil, is a blue disc depicting a starry sky (which includes the Southern Cross) spanned by a curved band inscribed with the national motto "Ordem e Progresso" ("Order and Progress"), within a yellow rhombus, on a green field. It was officially adopted on 19 November 1889 — four days after the Proclamation of the Republic, to replace the flag of the Empire of Brazil. The concept was the work of Raimundo Teixeira Mendes, with the collaboration of Miguel Lemos, Manuel Pereira Reis and Décio Villares.

The green field and yellow rhombus from the previous imperial flag were preserved (though slightly modified in hue and shape). In the imperial flag, the green represented the House of Braganza of Pedro I, the first Emperor of Brazil, while the yellow represented the House of Habsburg of his wife, Empress Maria Leopoldina. A blue circle with white five-pointed stars replaced the arms of the Empire of Brazil — its position in the flag reflects the sky over the city of Rio de Janeiro on 15 November 1889. The motto Ordem e Progresso is derived from Auguste Comte's motto of positivism: "L'amour pour principe et l'ordre pour base; le progrès pour but" ("Love as a principle and order as the basis; progress as the goal").

Each star, corresponding to a Brazilian Federal Unit, is sized in proportion relative to its geographic size, and, according to Brazilian Law, the flag must be updated in case of creation or extinction of a state. At the time the flag was first adopted in 1889, it had 21 stars. It then received one more star in 1960 (representing the state of Guanabara), then another in 1968 (representing Acre), and finally four more stars in 1992 (representing Amapá, Roraima, Rondônia and Tocantins), totalling 27 stars in its current version.

History

Empire of Brazil (1822–1889)

The imperial flag of Brazil was designed by Jean-Baptiste Debret as the Royal Standard of the Prince Royal of the United Kingdom of Portugal, Brazil and the Algarves, Pedro I.

After the Brazilian Declaration of Independence, and with the coronation of Pedro I as Emperor of Brazil, the Royal Standard was modified to become the flag of the Empire of Brazil. The new flag featured the imperial coat of arms within a yellow rhombus, on a green field. The green and yellow colors represented the dynastic houses of Pedro I and his consort Maria Leopoldina of Austria.

The imperial flag was slightly modified during the reign of Pedro II, when an extra star was added to the imperial arms to conform to the new territorial organization of the country.

Republic of Brazil (1889–present)

Upon the proclamation of the Republic, one of the civilian leaders of the movement, the jurist Ruy Barbosa, proposed a design for the nation's new flag strongly inspired by the flag of the United States. It was flown from 15 to 19 November 1889, when marshal Deodoro da Fonseca (acting as provisional president of Brazil) vetoed the design, citing concerns that it looked too similar to the flag of another country.

Fonseca suggested that the flag of the new republic should resemble the old imperial flag. This was intended to underscore continuity of national unity during the transition from a constitutional monarchy to a republic. Raimundo Teixeira Mendes presented a project in which the imperial coat of arms was replaced by a blue celestial globe and the positivist motto. It was presented to Fonseca, who promptly accepted. The flag was designed by a group formed by Raimundo Teixeira Mendes, Miguel Lemos, Manuel Pereira Reis and Décio Villares. It was officially adopted on 19 November 1889.

The flag has been modified on three occasions to add additional stars intended to reflect newly created states: 1960 (22 stars), 1968 (23 stars) and 1992 (27 stars). In contrast to many other national flags with elements representing political subdivisions, modifications to the flag of Brazil were not always made promptly upon political reorganisation, resulting in multi-year periods of history where there was a mismatch between the number of stars and the number of states and federal districts. The most recent modification was made on 11 May 1992, with the addition of four stars to the celestial globe (representing states created between 1982 and 1991), and a slight change in the stars' positions was made to match the astronomical coordinates correctly.

Design
Decree No. 4, issued on 19 November 1889, legally replaced the flag used under the constitutional monarchy with the new national flag. On 11 May 1992, Law No. 8.421, altered the celestial globe with the addition of six stars.

Construction

The precise positions of the 27 stars on the globe make the Brazilian flag one of the most complicated national flags to construct. The official design is defined by Law No. 5,700, issued on 1 September 1971. The flag's length is twenty modules and the width, fourteen, translating into an aspect ratio of 10:7. The distance of the vertices of the yellow rhombus to the outer frame is a module and seven-tenths (1.7 m). The blue circle in the middle of the yellow rhombus has a radius of three and a half modules (3.5 m). The center of the arcs of the white band is two modules (2 m) to the left of the meeting point of the extended vertical diameter of the circle with the base of the outer frame. The radius of the lower arc of the white band is eight modules (8m) and the radius of the upper arc of the white band is eight and a half modules (8.5 m). The width of the white band is a half of a module (0.5 m).

The caption "Ordem e Progresso" is written in green letters. The letter P lies on the vertical diameter of the circle. The letters of the word "Ordem" and the word "Progresso" are a third of a module (0.33 m) tall. The width of these letters is three-tenths of a module (0.30 m). The conjunction E has a height of three-tenths of a module (0.30 m) and a width of a quarter of a module (0.25 m).

The stars are of five different sizes: first, second, third, fourth and fifth magnitudes. They are drawn within circles whose diameters are: three-tenths of a module (0.30 m) for the first magnitude, a quarter of a module (0.25 m) for the second magnitude; a fifth of a module (0.20 m) for the third magnitude, a seventh of a module (0.14 m) for the fourth magnitude, and a tenth of a module (0.10 m) for the fifth magnitude.

Stars

Paulo Araújo Duarte of the Federal University of Santa Catarina claims that "the creators of our republican flag intended to represent the stars in the sky at Rio de Janeiro at 8:30 in the morning on 15 November 1889, the moment at which the constellation of the Southern Cross was on the meridian of Rio de Janeiro and the longer arm [of the cross] was vertical". Another article, citing "O Céu da Bandeira (The Sky of the Flag)", by J. R. V. Costa, says the exact time was actually 08:37. This last article includes the flag's designer's explanation of his intentions regarding the stars.
According to Brazil's national act number 5,700 of 1 September 1971, the flag portrays the stars as they would be seen by an imaginary observer an infinite distance above Rio de Janeiro standing outside the firmament in which the stars are meant to be placed (i.e. as found on a celestial globe). Thus Beta Crucis appears to the right of the constellation and Delta Crucis to the left, in mirror image of the way they actually appear in the sky (and, coincidentally, the way they appear on the Brazilian coat of arms).

The star Spica is the only one above the white band; it symbolises part of Brazilian territory in the northern hemisphere (and the State of Pará).

The Sigma Octantis (south pole star) is small, but all the other stars turn around it. Its unique position in the sky of the southern hemisphere represents the stability of the Federal District in the Brazilian union.

The shining star in constellation represent the size of territory of the state in the Brazilian region (constellation).

The flag of Brazil contains 27 stars, representing the Brazilian states and the Federal District. The constellation of the Southern Cross is on the meridian (indicated by the number 6 in the diagram). To the south of it is Polaris Australis (Sigma Octantis, numbered 7), representing the Federal District. A single star lies above the band, representing the large northern state of Pará, which straddles the equator.

The band with its motto appears roughly coincident with the ecliptic, as in the armillary symbol of Manuel I of Portugal and colonial Brazil, or otherwise the celestial equator, while none of the stars symbolized lie north of these lines. Some interpretations of the band also identify it with the Amazon river.

Stars and states 
The stars depicted on the flag and the states they represent are:

  Brazil's original Federal District was created in 1889 from the former Neutral Municipality covering the then-capital city of Rio de Janeiro, and represented on the flag by the star Sigma Octantis (Polaris Australis). In 1960, to correspond with the creation of the new capital, Brasília, the Federal District was reconstituted on new territory carved out of the state of Goiás, bordering the Minas Gerais state; it continued to be represented on the flag by Sigma Octantis. The former Federal District became the new state of Guanabara and a new star, Alphard, was added to the flag to represent it. Guanabara was eliminated as a separate state in 1975; however, Alphard was not removed from the flag and from 1975 to 1979 it represented no state. When the new state of Mato Grosso do Sul was created in 1979, it was assigned Alphard.

Colours
The flag's colours are not accurately specified in any legal document. The CMYK and Pantone values, as found in the files available for download from the Brazilian Government website, are listed below:

Flag protocol

Federal Law No. 5,700, issued on 1 September 1971, defines the flag protocol in Brazil. The flag must be permanently hoisted at the Praça dos Três Poderes in Brasília. The flag must be raised and lowered daily at the presidential palaces (Palácio do Planalto and Palácio da Alvorada); ministries; National Congress; Supreme Federal Tribunal; Supreme Court of Justice; seats of the Executive, Legislative and Judicial branches; diplomatic missions; Federal, state and local institutions; and merchant navy units. When a flag is no longer fit to use, it must be delivered to a military facility to be burned during a special ceremony on 19 November ("Flag Day").

The flag must be flown at half-staff when the President decrees official mourning. In addition, state and local governments may decree official mourning with the death of a mayor or governor. When the flag is displayed at half-staff, prior to raising or lowering it, the flag must be raised to the top of the flagpole and then lowered to the halfway mark. When the flag is being carried in procession, a black crape ribbon must be tied to the top of the mast.

A foreign flag may only be flown with a Brazilian Flag along its right side. The only exceptions are when the foreign flag is displayed in an embassy or consulate and in prize-giving ceremonies of sport competitions won by foreign athletes. When multiple flags are raised or lowered simultaneously, the Brazilian Flag must be the first to reach the top of the flagpole and the last to reach the bottom.

Folding

Flag anthem

The Brazilian Flag Anthem (Hino à Bandeira Nacional) is a song dedicated to the country's flag. It is performed on 19 November (Flag Day). The Portuguese lyrics were written by poet Olavo Bilac, and the music composed by Francisco Braga.

Other flags

Governmental flags
The president and vice president are also represented by their own flag. The  is a dark green rectangle (ratio 2:3) holding the national coat of arms on its center. It is usually hoisted at the President's official residence, the Palácio da Alvorada, and at the President's workplace, the Palácio do Planalto. It is also displayed on the presidential car, as small-sized flags. The  is a yellow rectangle (ratio 2:3) with twenty-three blue stars disposed in a cross dividing the flag into four equal quadrants, with the coat of arms in the middle of the upper left quadrant.

Military flags
Some of the branches of the Brazilian military also have their own flags.

Naval jack
The Brazilian naval jack (jaque) is a rectangular flag (ratio 3:4) bearing 21 white stars on a dark blue field – a horizontal row of 13 and a vertical column of 9, orthogonally displayed.

Previous flags
The list below identifies previous flags used in Brazil.

Rejected flags
The best-known rejected flags are listed below. Several projects were heavily inspired by the green-yellow Imperial Flag, while a black-white-red pattern was also proposed. Those colours would represent the major groups of Brazilian population, red being the natives, white the European settlers and immigrants and black the Africans.

Notes

See also 

 List of Brazilian flags

References

External links 

 Bandeira Nacional at the Brazilian Government
 Bandeira - Insígnia at the Brazilian Government
 
 Brazil  at Flags Corner

 
Brazil
National symbols of Brazil
Southern Cross flags
Brazil
Brazil
Brazil
Brazil